Azizuddin Ahmad was a Member of the 1st National Assembly of Pakistan as a representative of East Pakistan.

Career
Ahmad was a Member of the Constituent Assembly of Pakistan. He was a member of the Standing Advisory Committee on Communication. He was the State Minister of Minority Affairs.

Personal life 
Ahmad's son, Naziruddin Ahmed, was the Managing Director of House Building Finance Corporation and died on 17 January 2021.

References

Pakistani MNAs 1947–1954

Year of birth missing
Year of death missing
Members of the Constituent Assembly of Pakistan